Performance Space is an arts organisation based in Sydney, Australia, that develops and presents interdisciplinary arts and experimental theatre.

It was established in 1983 in a venue in Cleveland St, Redfern with Christopher Allen as its manager. The building was formerly the State Rail Authority Trade Union Dance Hall.

In 2007 it moved to the Carriageworks contemporary multi-arts centre.

Performance Space is a member of the advocacy organisation Contemporary Art Organisations Australia.

References

External links 
 

Organisations based in Sydney
Australian contemporary art
Experimental theatre
Culture of Sydney